Julien Bargeton (born 29 March 1973) is a French politician who has served as a Senator for Paris since 2017. A former member of the Socialist Party (PS), which he left in June 2017 to join La République En Marche! (LREM), he previously served as Deputy Mayor of Paris for Transport (2012–2014) under Bertrand Delanoë and for Finance (2014–2017) under Anne Hidalgo.

Career
A 2000 graduate of the École nationale d'administration, Bargeton joined the Court of Audit as a financial magistrate prior to his involvement in politics.

On 29 March 2008, shortly after his election to the Council of Paris, he assumed the first deputy mayorship of the 20th arrondissement, a position he held until 5 April 2014. On 9 July 2012, he was named Deputy Mayor of Paris for Transport by Mayor Bertrand Delanoë, succeeding Annick Lepetit. On 5 April 2014, he was named Deputy Mayor of Paris for Finance by newly-elected Mayor Anne Hidalgo, a position he held until his resignation on 6 October 2017 following his election to the Senate.

He subsequently returned to the Council of Paris as president of a new group for La République En Marche, Democrats and Progressists, on 20 November 2017. Elected to the Regional Council of Île-de-France in 2021, Bargeton left the Council of Paris on 28 June 2020 following the 2020 municipal election.

References

1973 births
Living people
Socialist Party (France) politicians
La République En Marche! politicians
Politicians from Paris
Sciences Po alumni
ESSEC Business School alumni
École nationale d'administration alumni
Judges of the Court of Audit (France)
French Senators of the Fifth Republic
Senators of Paris
Councillors of Paris
Members of the Regional Council of Île-de-France